Magdalena Cielecka (born 20 February 1972) is a Polish actress.

Life and career
Cielecka spent her childhood in the small town of Żarki-Letnisko. In 1995, she graduated from Państwowa Wyższa Szkoła Teatralna in Kraków. Soon after, she joined the Teatr Stary Theatre Company in Kraków, where she stayed until 2001, when she moved to Warsaw and joined the Teatr Rozmaitości Theatre Company.

Although she made her first cinema appearance quite early in a film by Barbara Sass called Pokuszenie (1995), she initially was known mainly for her work in theatre. A few years later she became widely recognized as an actress and she gained popularity with her cinematic roles such as Samotność w sieci or the TV series Magda M.

At the 2008 Edinburgh International Festival she played the leading role in a critically acclaimed adaptation of Kane's 4.48 Psychosis by the Polish theatre company Teatr Rozmaitości.

Filmography
 Pokuszenie (1995)
 L'Élève (1996)
 Sława i chwała (1998) TV mini-series
 Amok (1998)
 Jak narkotyk (1999)
 Zakochani (2000)
 Egoiści (2000)
 Weiser (2001)
 Listy miłosne (2001)
 Faithful (2002)
 Powiedz to, Gabi (2003)
 Trzeci (2004)
 Po sezonie (2005)
 Boża podszewka. Cześć druga (2005) TV series
 S@motność w sieci (2006)
 Palimpsest (2006)
 Chaos (2006)
 Oficerowie (2006) TV mini-series
 Kolekcja (2006) (TV)
 Magda M. (TV series)
 Droga wewnętrzna (2006) (TV)
 Katyń (2007)
 The Lure (2015)
 United States of Love (2016)
 Blind Love (2015 film) (2016)
 Breaking the Limits (2017)
 Ciemno, prawie noc (2019)
 A Girl and an Astronaut (2023)

References

External links
 
 Interview with Magdalena Cielecka, Scotland on Sunday, 3 August 2008
 Magdalena Cielecka at culture.pl

1972 births
Polish actresses
Living people